National Steel and Shipbuilding Company, commonly referred to as NASSCO, is an American shipbuilding company with four shipyards located in San Diego, Norfolk, Bremerton, and Mayport. It is a division of General Dynamics. NASSCO owns a subsidiary manufacturing facility with TIMSA in Mexicali, Mexico. The San Diego shipyard specializes in constructing commercial cargo ships and auxiliary vessels for the US Navy and Military Sealift Command; it is the only new-construction shipyard on the West Coast of the United States. NASSCO performs ship repairs and conversions for the United States Navy in all 4 Shipyard locations; San Diego, Norfolk, Bremerton, and Mayport.

History 
The origin of NASSCO traces to 1905 and a small machine shop and foundry known as California Iron Works. In 1922 California Iron Works was taken over by U.S. National Bank and renamed National Iron Works.

In 1944 National Iron Works moved to its present location at 28th Street and Harbor Drive on San Diego Bay, and in 1949 the company was renamed National Steel and Shipbuilding Co. to reflect its expansion into ship construction. In 1959 the company was acquired by four corporations, including Kaiser Industries and Morrison-Knudsen. In 1979 Morrison-Knudsen bought out Kaiser's share, and in 1989 management acquired the company from Morrison-Knudsen via an employee stock ownership plan.

In 1940 the company's ironworkers organized into a union. By 1979 the company had 7,900 employees organized into six unions. There was a labor strike in 1988 in which employees demanded a minimal wage of $12 per hour. Another 25-day-long strike in 1992 resulted in workers returning to work without a contract. In 1996, another labor strike hit the company. Around 2,700 employees didn't show up at work while 50 marched in front of the company with picket signs.

In 1998 General Dynamics bought NASSCO in a $415 million deal.

On October 31, 2011 General Dynamics-NASSCO acquired Metro Machine Corp, a surface-ship repair company in Norfolk, Virginia, and renamed it NASSCO-Norfolk. The company had been conducting ship repairs and conversions for the U.S. Navy since 1972. The NASSCO-Norfolk shipyard had the newest dry dock in the country, with two auto-start generators, automated ballast control system and automated ship hauling and centering system.

Work done

NASSCO began building commercial cargo ships in 1959, eventually including large cargo ships and Alaska-class oil tankers. Its most famous commercial ship was the Exxon Valdez tanker, which completed construction at NASSCO in 1986, and in 1989 returned to NASSCO for repairs after its accident and oil spill in Alaska. In December 2012 the company signed a contract to build two  container ships powered by liquefied natural gas (LNG). When completed they will be the largest LNG-powered ships of any kind in the world.

Beginning in the 1990s the company won Navy contracts to build AOE-10 support ships, strategic sealift ships, and TOTE Orca-class trailerships. Additional Navy contracts awarded during the 2000s included maintenance of the San Diego-based USS Ticonderoga (CG-47) and USS Spruance (DD-963) warships. In 2001 the Navy awarded NASSCO its largest order in company history, to build the Lewis and Clark-class dry cargo ships (T-AKE), a 14-ship program with a contract value of $3.7 billion. The company has a contract to build at least three Mobile Landing Platform ships, a new class of ship for the U.S. Navy. Construction on the first vessel began in July 2011 and the keel was laid for the second in December 2012. In 2016, Matson, Inc ordered two Kanaloa-class freighters, to be delivered near the end of the decade.

References

External links

Falls Church, Virginia
General Dynamics
Manufacturing companies based in San Diego
San Diego Bay
Shipbuilding companies of California
Vehicle manufacturing companies established in 1905
1905 establishments in California